This is the discography of Army of Lovers, a Eurodance project founded in Sweden in 1987, fronted by Alexander Bard, Jean-Pierre Barda and Camilla Henemark.

Best known internationally for their song "Crucified," Army of Lovers had success across Europe with four studio albums, six compilation albums and 27 singles.

Although their singles "Israelism", "Obsession" and "Ride the Bullet" scored chart success across Europe, their success in the US and the UK was limited, (though "Crucified" reached the top 40 in the UK Singles Chart).

Albums

Studio albums

Compilation albums

Extended plays

Singles

Other recordings
1992 – "Hasta Mañana" – from the 1992 Swedish compilation ABBA – The Tribute. This cover was also included on the 1999 album ABBA: A Tribute – The 25th Anniversary Celebration. Also was Dominika Peczynski's first song with the band

Video

Video albums
 Videovaganza 1990-1993 (VHS, 1993)
 Hurrah Hurrah Apocalypse - The Definitive Video Collection (DVD, 2005)

Music videos
1988 "When the Night Is Cold"
1990 "Ride the Bullet" (with La Camilla)
1990 "My Army of Lovers"
1991 "Crucified" 
1991 "Obsession" (with La Camilla)
1992 "Ride the Bullet" (with Michaela)
1992 "Obsession" (with Michaela)
1992 "Judgment Day"
1993 "Israelism"
1993 "La Plage de Saint Tropez"
1993 "Sons of Lucy"
1993 "I Am"
1994 "Lit de Parade"
1994 "Sexual Revolution"
1995 "Give My Life"
1996 "King Midas"
2001 "Let the Sunshine In"
2001 "Hands Up"
2013 "Signed on my Tattoo" (feat. Gravitonas)
2013 "Crucified 2013"
2014 "People Are Lonely" (Gravitonas feat. Army of Lovers)

References

External links

Discographies of Swedish artists